Turn Around, Look at Us was the first compilation album released by the Bee Gees in 1967 on Festival Records. It was released only in Australia and New Zealand. The album effectively served as a mop-up compilation, featuring all the group's single tracks that had not been available on their two Australian albums, though three tracks from The Bee Gees Sing and Play 14 Barry Gibb Songs made repeat appearances.

Track listing

References

1967 compilation albums
Bee Gees compilation albums
Festival Records compilation albums